BeBee is a social network for business collaboration.

Bebee or other variations may also refer to:

 Bebee, West Virginia, an unincorporated community in Wetzel County
 Tibicos, aka bébée, a brewing ingredient of bacteria and yeast
 "Bébée", an 1874 short story that became the basis of the movie Two Little Wooden Shoes, written by Ouida
 "La Bébée" (aka Klatschtanz), the Baby Polka, a 19th-century dance, see Culture of Guernsey
 Bebee, a fictional character from the Turkish children's television show Pepee

See also
 Beebee (disambiguation)
 Beebe (disambiguation)
 Bebe (disambiguation)
 BB (disambiguation)
 Bibi (disambiguation)